The Piano Concerto in C-sharp minor, Op. 45, is a composition for solo piano and orchestra in four movements by the American composer Amy Beach.  The work was composed between September 1898 and September 1899.  It was first performed in Boston on April 7, 1900, with the composer as the soloist and the Boston Symphony Orchestra performing under the conductor Wilhelm Gericke.  The composition is dedicated to the musician Teresa Carreño and was the first piano concerto by an American female composer.

Composition

Structure and origins
The concerto has a duration of roughly 37 minutes and is composed in four movements:

The first movement "Allegro moderato" is composed in sonata form and is the longest of the four movements.  The second theme of this movement is based on Beach's song "Jeune fille et jeune fleur", Op. 1, No. 3. The "Scherzo" is based on Beach's song "Empress of Night", Op. 2, No. 3, originally set to a poem by her husband Henry Beach and dedicated to her mother Clara Cheney, née Marcy. Likewise, the somber third movement "Largo" is based on Beach's song "Twilight", Op. 2, No. 1, and is dedicated to her husband, whose poetry again served as the original text.  The fourth movement "Allegro con scioltezza" recalls the theme from the third movement while ushering in an exuberant finale.

Instrumentation
The work is scored for solo piano and an orchestra comprising two flutes (doubling piccolo), two oboes, two clarinets (doubling bass clarinet), two bassoons, four horns, two trumpets, three trombones, tuba, timpani, and strings.

Reception
About the 1900 premiere, the critic Philip Hale wrote that it was "a disappointment in nearly every way," despite expectations based on the Gaelic Symphony. Dedicatee Teresa Carreño wrote a friendly letter to Beach but because of objections from her manager, did not perform the concerto. Beach had to become her own apostle for the piece and in 1913—1917 played the solo part in it with nine different orchestras, including some notable successes in Germany.
 
The Piano Concerto has been praised as an overlooked masterwork by modern critics.  Phil Greenfield of The Baltimore Sun called it "a colorful, dashing work that might become extremely popular if enough people get a chance to hear it."  Joshua Kosman of the San Francisco Chronicle also lauded the composition, writing:

Andrew Achenbach of Gramophone similarly declared it "ambitious" and "singularly impressive", remarking:

See also
List of compositions by Amy Beach

References

Sources

External links

Compositions by Amy Beach
1899 compositions
Beach
Compositions in C-sharp minor